The Batcopter is the fictional personal helicopter of the DC Comics superhero Batman.

Wayne Aerospace

The military aviation branch designs and manufactures jet fighters and helicopters for the U.S. military. The most notable models of these are the W-4 Wraith fighter and the Kestrel attack helicopter.

Whirly-Bat
The Whirly-Bat was Batman's single-occupant mini-copter, designed with an aft counter tail rotor, which it would need to keep from spinning out of control. It was swift and highly-maneuverable. However, the Whirly-Bat's lightweight design prohibited the additional weight of offensive weaponry.

The Whirly-Bat makes an appearance in the 2012 video game Lego Batman 2: DC Super Heroes. They occasionally made appearances in Filmation's The Adventures of Batman and Robin, 1968.

Flying Batcave
The "Flying Batcave" was a giant helicopter with many of the real Batcave's scientific amenities. They included:
Panoramic video surveillance
Smoke-screen generators to provide artificial cloud-over.

However, the "Flying Batcave" required frequent refueling, thus significantly reducing patrol time.

In relation to Batman (TV series)

During lease

The first appearance of the Batcopter was in the 1966 film Batman.  Unlike the Batmobile, the Batcycle, and the Batboat, it was not intended for use in the 1960s Batman television series, which did not have the budget to create such elaborate vehicles.  While the other vehicles were bought by 20th Century Fox, the Batcopter was only leased for the movie.  It cost Fox $750 a day for five days from April 7 to April 11, 1966. 

The Batcopter was a functional helicopter provided by National Helicopter Service.  It was based on the Bell 47, which was designed by Bell Helicopter Textron in 1941.  The Batcopter was a G3B-1 model with FAA registration N3079G, which had previously been used in the TV-series Lassie and ABC News.  To make the model look more like a superhero vehicle, it was fitted with canvas-covered tubular frames and was painted red.  The head of a bat was painted in the front while the Batman symbol was painted on the side.  The most dangerous design change was the wings, which reduced power by nearly fifty percent.

For the scenes at sea, the Batcopter was taped at Marineland of the Pacific in Palos Verdes, California.  Most of the shots were relatively far away as the pilot was Harry Haus, not Adam West, the actor playing Batman. Hubie Kerns donned the Batman outfit to perform the stunts, namely climbing the rope ladder attached to the helicopter while kicking and pepper-spraying a shark which then explodes.

Additional footage of the Batcopter was shot for eventual inclusion in seasons two and three of the TV series.

After lease
When the Batcopter was returned to National, the wings and tubes were removed.  It was repainted to look like all the other helicopters and was used for various purposes over the years, such as covering the 1968 Super Bowl.  Eventually National replaced its Bell 47's and sold them.  The helicopter which had previously served as the Batcopter was bought by the President of NockAir Helicopter, Inc., Eugene Nock.  He repainted it and replaced the tubes so that it could once again be called the Batcopter.  The wings, however, were not replaced as they were manufactured specifically for the Batman movie and were insured for only that use. Extending the products liability insurance for their continued use after the movie was not possible so National kept the wings in-house for many years in case a sequel was considered. The wings were destroyed around 1979 so that there would be no possibility of their re-installation.  The Batcopter has been retrofitted with new equipment and electronics so that it can now attain altitudes up to 18000 feet, speeds up to 105 miles per hour, and flight times up to 2 hours and 45 minutes.

Film
A helicopter-like vehicle appears in the film The Dark Knight Rises referred to simply as the Bat. It is an unconventional, lightweight volantor-like craft with a ventrally mounted rotor. Developed by Lucius Fox, the Bat was originally intended for close-quarters urban military operations but instead becomes Batman's new primary vehicle. Fox notes that the Bat's autopilot function does not work but suggests that Bruce might be capable of fixing it. The vehicle is armed with machine guns, cannons and a variation of the EMP device he used chasing Bane's men. Batman first uses the Bat to escape pursuing police officers after being cornered in a dark alley. Immediately after, he uses it to rescue Selina Kyle from Bane's henchmen. Later in the film's climax, Batman uses the Bat in the fight to retake Gotham City from Bane and he uses the Bat to haul a fusion bomb away from Gotham City where it detonates over the ocean and presumably kills him. Later, while completing work on the Bat, Fox discovers that Wayne had fixed the autopilot function months before and may have escaped before the bomb detonated. In designing the Bat, Nathan Crowley approached it as if it were an actual military project, emphasising the need for it to "fit into the same family" as the Tumbler and the Batpod. The final version of the Bat takes its design cues from the Harrier jump jet, Bell Boeing V-22 Osprey and the Boeing AH-64 Apache. Chris Corbould described the Bat's size and shape as presenting a major challenge for filming given Christopher Nolan's emphasis on practical effects over computer-generated imagery. In order to make the Bat "fly", it was variously supported by wires, suspended from cranes and helicopters, and mounted on a purpose-built vehicle with hydraulic controls to simulate movement.

Toys
Kenner created a Batcopter toy in the 1984 as part of its Super Powers Collection. It was remade in black and gold in 1990 as part of The Dark Knight Collection. Art Asylum also created a toy version of the Batcopter for C3 Sets Wave 2 of Minimates in 2005.  For the 2005 movie Batman Begins there was a Batcopter toy made by Mattel.  Lego's Batman range of sets for 2007 includes a version of the Batcopter with the Scarecrow's biplane in the #7786 Batcopter: The Hunt For The Scarecrow set.  There was a Batcopter like toy made by Mattel for the 2008 movie The Dark Knight, it went by the name of "Attack Copter".

References

External links
The Unofficial Batcopter Biography
Batman: Collected Issues of the Dark Knight - Batman #203
Television - Batman: The Series - Gadgets - Batcopter
Character Profiles - Gadgets - Batcopter
Character Profiles - Gadgets - Flying Batcave
Character Profiles - Gadgets - Whirly-Bat
Character Profiles - Gadgets - Batgyro
FAA registry of the Batcopter

Fictional elements introduced in 1951